2008 Albanian Supercup is the 15th edition of the Albanian Supercup since its establishment in 1989. The match was contested between the 2008 Cup winners Vllaznia Shkodër and the 2007–08 Albanian Superliga champions Dinamo Tirana.

Dinamo Tirana won the final by 2 goals to nil and lifted the cup after years of Tirana dominance of the event.

Details

See also
 2007–08 Albanian Superliga
 2007–08 Albanian Cup

References

2008
Supercup
Albanian Supercup, 2008
Albanian Supercup, 2008